Western music is a form of country music composed by and about the people who settled and worked throughout the Western United States and Western Canada. Western music celebrates the lifestyle of the cowboy on the open ranges, Rocky Mountains, and prairies of Western North America. Directly related musically to old English, Irish, Scottish, and folk ballads, also the Mexican folk music of Northern Mexico and Southwestern United States influenced the development of this genre, particularly corrido, ranchera, New Mexico and Tejano. Western music shares similar roots with Appalachian music (also called country or hillbilly music), which developed around the same time throughout Appalachia and the Appalachian Mountains. The music industry of the mid-20th century grouped the two genres together under the banner of country and western music, later amalgamated into the modern name, country music.

Origins
Western music was directly influenced by the folk music traditions of England, Wales, Scotland, and Ireland, and many cowboy songs, sung around campfires in the 19th century, such as "Streets of Laredo", can be traced back to European folk songs.

Reflecting the realities of the open range and ranch houses where the music originated, the early cowboy bands were string bands supplemented occasionally with the harmonica. The harmonica, invented in the early 19th century in central Europe, arrived in North America shortly before the American Civil War; its small size and portability made it a favorite among the American public and the flood of pioneers heading westward.

Otto Gray, an early cowboy band leader, stated authentic Western music had only three rhythms, all coming from the gaits of the cow pony:  walk, trot, and lope. Gray also noted the uniqueness of this spontaneous American song product, and the freedom of expression of the singers.

It is a common impression that Western music began with the cowboy, but this is not the case. The first "western" song was published in 1844. Titled "Blue Juniata", the song is about a young Indian maid waiting for her brave along the banks of the Juniata River in Pennsylvania (at that time, anything west of the Appalachian Mountains was considered "out West"). The song was recorded and sung by the Sons of the Pioneers over a hundred years later and is still being sung today. Subsequent "western" songs down through the years have dealt with many aspects of the West, such as the mountain men, the '49ers, the immigrants, the outlaws, the lawmen, the cowboy, and, of course, the beauty and grandeur of the West. Western music is not limited to the American cowboy.

In 1908, N. Howard "Jack" Thorp published the first book of Western music, titled Songs of the Cowboys. Containing only lyrics and no musical notation, the book was very popular west of the Mississippi River. Most of these cowboy songs are of unknown authorship, but among the best known is "Little Joe the Wrangler" written by Thorp himself.

In 1910, John Lomax, in his book Cowboy Songs and Other Frontier Ballads, first gained national attention for Western music. His book contained some of the same songs as Thorp's book, though in variant versions (most had been collected before Thorp's book was published). Lomax's compilation included many musical scores. Lomax published a second collection in 1919 titled Songs of the Cattle Trail and Cow Camp.

With the advent of radio and recording devices, the music found an audience previously ignored by music schools and Tin Pan Alley. Many Westerners preferred familiar music about themselves and their environment.

The first successful cowboy band to tour the East was Otto Gray's Oklahoma Cowboys, put together by William McGinty, an Oklahoma pioneer and former Rough Rider. The band appeared on radio and toured the vaudeville circuit from 1924 through 1936. They recorded few songs, however, so are overlooked by many scholars of Western music.

Various musicians recorded western songs in the 1920s and early 1930s, before the popularization of commercial singing cowboys, including Carl T. Sprague, John I. White, Jules Verne Allen, Harry McClintock, Tex Owens, and Wilf Carter alias Montana Slim. Many of these early western singers had grown up on ranches and farms or had experience working as cowboys. They typically performed simple arrangements with rustic vocal performances and a simple guitar or fiddle accompaniment.

Mainstream popularity 
Throughout the 1930s and 1940s, Western music became widely popular through the romanticization of the cowboy and idealized depictions of the west in Hollywood films. Singing cowboys, such as Gene Autry and Roy Rogers, sang cowboy songs in their films and became popular throughout the United States. Film producers began incorporating fully orchestrated four-part harmonies and sophisticated musical arrangements into their motion pictures. Bing Crosby, the most popular singer of that time, recorded numerous cowboy and Western songs and starred in the Western musical film Rhythm on the Range (1936). During this era, the most popular recordings and musical radio shows included Western music. Western swing also developed during this time.

Decline in popularity/1950s-70s 
The Western Writers of America was formed in 1953 to promote excellence in Western-style writing, including songwriting. Late 1950s, Frankie Laine recorded TV drama Theme "Rawhide".

In 1964, the Country & Western Music Academy was formed in an effort to promote Western music, primarily in the Western United States. The Academy was formed in response to the Nashville-oriented Country Music Association that had formed in 1958. The Academy's first awards were largely dominated by Bakersfield-based artists such as Buck Owens. Over time, the Academy evolved into the Academy of Country Music and its mission is no longer distinguished from other country music organizations.

By the 1960s, the popularity of Western music was in decline. Relegated to the country and western genre by marketing agencies, popular Western recording artists sold fewer albums and attracted smaller audiences. Rock and roll dominated music sales and Hollywood recording studios dropped most of their Western artists (a few artists did successfully cross between the two, most prominently Johnny Cash, whose breakthrough hit "Folsom Prison Blues"(1955, Live=1968) combined a western theme with a rock-and-roll arrangement). In addition, the Nashville sound, based more on pop ballads than on folk music, came to dominate the country and western commercial sales; except for the label, much of the music was indistinguishable from rock and roll or popular classes of music. The resulting backlash from Western music purists led to the development of country music styles much more influenced by Western music, including the Bakersfield sound and outlaw country. Willie Nelson, Waylon Jennings and Kris Kristofferson were singers in outlaw country genre. In 1979 Johnny Cash recorded "Ghost Riders in the Sky (A Cowboy Legend)".

Cowboy pop 

Authors such as Barry Mazor, Richard Carlin and John T. Davis have used the term cowboy pop to describe the music of cowboy singers in western films. Jimmy Wakely, for example, was described by Mazor as a cowboy pop singer, and he has written that "when singing cowboy movies ruled, Hollywood hardly made a distinction between the sounds of cowboy pop balladeers and another sound entirely, born in Texas, in which Jimmie Rodgers had a formative role." Several writers have emphasized that historically country music and cowboy music were not considered the same genre; for example, in her essay "Cowboy Songs", Anne Dingus wrote that "cowboy music is not country music, though the two are often lumped together as 'country and western'." In 1910, John Avery Lomax anthologized over a hundred cowboy songs in his collection Cowboy Songs and Other Frontier Ballads.

Rediscovery 
Older Western music is widely streamed on major platforms, with music by Marty Robbins and Al Hurricane being more easily accessible. Newer takes on Western music are constantly written and recorded and performed all across the American West and Western Canada, thanks to the popularity of New Mexico music within New Mexico and the success of Michael Martin Murphey throughout the Western scene, they’ve resurrected the cowboy song genre, promoting Western singers, Route 66 rockabilly, and cowboy poets. The style has even seen a popularity resurgence globally, thanks to the Western's newfound popularity on streaming services and video games.

The Western Music Association was established in 1989 to preserve and promote Western music. Western music in video games can be traced back to The Oregon Trail series, early Nintendo title Sheriff/Bandido, and arcade games like Sunset Riders. Fallout: New Vegas relies on a atmospheric Western music style, but it also features old mid-20th century popular Western musicians such as Marty Robbins along with pop music of the day. Furthermore, the Red Dead series of games heavily features Western music, since it takes place in an Old West setting. Bill Elm and Woody Jackson's modern spin on an Old Western game would not be complete without their carefully assembled score; what they call their best project to date Independent video games SteamWorld and Gunman Clive also make use of Western music, as do other larger productions such as Dillon's Rolling Western.

The music of Colter Wall is a part of this revival.

List of Western songs 

 "Abilene"
 "Along the Navaho Trail"
 "Along the Santa Fe Trail"
 "Back in the Saddle Again"
 "Ballad of the Alamo"
 "Bonanza"
 "Buenas Tardes Amigo"
 "Big Iron"
 "Billy the Kid"
 "Blue Shadows on the Trail"
 "Blue Prairie"
 "Buffalo Gals (Won't You Come Out Tonight?)"
 "Bury Me Not on the Lone Prairie"
 "Call of the Canyon"
 "Carry Me Back to the Lone Prairie"
 "The Cattle Call"
 "Cheyenne"
 "Cimarron (Roll On)"
 "Cocaine Blues"
 "Cool Water"
 "Cow-Cow Boogie (Cuma-Ti-Yi-Yi-Ay)"
 "The Cowboy's Life"
 "Coyotes"
 "Oh My Darling, Clementine"
 "Deep in the Heart of Texas"
 "Don't Fence Me In"
 "Don't Take Your Guns to Town"
 "El Paso"
 "El Paso City"
 "Ghee on My Hands"

 "Ghost Riders in the Sky (A Cowboy Legend)"
 "Git Along, Little Dogies"
 "Halfway to Montana"
 "The Hills of Old Wyoming"
 "Happy Trails"
 "Hold on Little Dogies"
 "Home on the Range"
 "I'm an Old Cowhand (From the Rio Grande)"
 "I Ride an Old Paint"
 "I Want to Be a Cowboy's Sweetheart"
 "Jim", a lament about a cowboy whose friend has died at an early age
 "Jingle Jangle Jingle (I Got Spurs)"
 "Little Joe the Wrangler"
 "The Last Roundup"
 "The Lone Star Trail"
 "The Lonesome Rider"
 "Man Walks Among Us"
 "The Masters Call"
 "Me and My Uncle"

 "Muleskinner Blues"
 "Night Rider's Lament"
 "Oh! Susanna"
 "The Old Chisholm Trail"
 "On the Trail of the Buffalo", also known as "The Buffalo Skinners" or "The Hills of Mexico"
 "The Oregon Trail" 
 "Pistol Packin' Mama"
 "Rawhide"
 "Red River Valley"
 "Red Wing"
 "Rocky Mountain Express"
 "Rogue River Valley"
 "San Antonio Rose"
 "Sioux City Sue"
 "Song of the Sierras"
 "The Strawberry Roan"
 "Streets Of Laredo"
 "Sweet Betsy from Pike"
 "Texas Plains"
 "Texas Rangers", about an ill-fated unit of Texas Rangers, headed to the Rio Grande, whose "time had come to die"
 "Tumbling Tumbleweeds"
 "Utah Carol"
 "The Wayward Wind"
 "When the Cactus Is in Bloom"
 "The Yellow Rose of Texas"
 "Young Wesley"

References

Bibliography
 Cannon, Hal. Old Time Cowboy Songs. Gibbs Smith. 
 Green, Douglas B. Singing in the Saddle: The History of the Singing Cowboy. Vanderbilt University Press, August 2002. 
 Hull, Myra. "Cowboy Ballads".
 Johnson, Thomas S.  "That Ain't Country: The Distinctiveness of Commercial Western Music." JEMF Quarterly. Vol 17, No. 62, Summer, 1981. pp 75–84.
 Lomax, John A., M.A. Cowboy Songs and Other Frontier Ballads. The MacMillan Company, 1918. Online edition (pdf)
 O'Neal, Bill; Goodwin, Fred. The Sons of the Pioneers. Eakin Press, 2001. 
 Otto Gray and his Oklahoma Cowboys. Early Cowboy Band. British Archive of Country Music, 2006. CD D 139
 Quay, Sara E. Westward Expansion. Greenwood Press, 2000. 
Shirley, Glenn "Daddy of the Cowboy Bands. Oklahoma Today (Fall 1959), 9:4 6-7, 29.
 Thorp, N. Howard "Jack". Songs of the Cowboys. Houghton Mifflin Company, 1908, 1921.
 White, John I. Git Along Little Dogies: Songs and Songmakers of the American West. (Music in American Life) series, University of Illinois Press, 1989 reprint.

External links
 The Academy of Western Artists
The Western Music Association
 Roughstock's History of Country Music
 Rex Allen 'Arizona Cowboy' Museum & Willcox Cowboy Hall of Fame – Willcox, Arizona
 Nudie's Rodeo Tailors for country & western artists
 Country & Western Music Directory
 KPOV-FM, Bend, Oregon—Calling All Cowboys, a weekly music program online featuring Western Music
Voices of Oklahoma interview with Guy Logsdon. First person interview conducted on February 16, 2010, with Guy Logsdon, Western music historian

 
American styles of music
Canadian styles of music
Country music genres
Music
Music